Elena Eugenia Manson (18 August 1898 – 15 September 1994) was a French film actress. She appeared in more than 100 films between 1925 and 1989.

Selected filmography

 La vocation d'André Carel (1925) – L'amoureuse de Cardan
 The Mystery of the Villa Rose (1930) – Hélène Vauquier
 The Brothers Karamazov (1931) – Fénia
 The Indictment (1931) – Annette Evans
 Monsieur le duc (1931) – La secrétaire
 Kameradschaft (1931) – Rose, la femme du mineur blessé
 Narcotics (1932) – L'infirmière (uncredited)
 Le cas du docteur Brenner (1933) – L'infirmière
 Madame Bovary (1934) – Héloïse Bovary
 Fedora (1934) – La femme de chambre
 Coralie et Cie (1934) – L'infirmière
 Un train dans la nuit (1934) – La folle
 Pension Mimosas (1935) – La petite rentière
 Helene (1936) – Valérie
 À Venise, une nuit (1937) – Julie
 Rail Pirates (1938) – Madame Teysseire
 Bar du sud (1938)
 Ultima giovinezza (1939) – Maria
 Second Childhood (1939) – Marie
 L'empreinte du Dieu (1940) – La soeur de Karelina
 Who Killed Santa Claus? (1941) – Marie Coquillot
 The Strangers in the House (1942) – Madame Manu
 Le journal tombe à cinq heures (1942) – Marie Le Goard
 The Benefactor (1942) – Gertrude, la bonne
 Picpus (1943) – Marie, la bonne (uncredited)
 Marie-Martine (1943) – Madame Limousin
 The Stairs Without End (1943) – Mademoiselle Michaud
 Le Corbeau (1943) – Marie Corbin – l'infirmière
 The Man from London (1943) – Julie Malouin
 Mermoz (1943) – Madame Mermoz
 The Eternal Husband (1946) – La mère de Mathias le hussard
 Her Final Role (1946)
 The Murderer is Not Guilty (1946) – Anne-Marie Mahé
 Nuit sans fin (1947) – La fille Leleuf
 Manon (1949) – La commère (une paysanne normande)
 The Wolf (1949) – Alphonsine
 Return to Life (1949) – Simone (segment 1 : "Le retour de tante Emma")
 The Farm of Seven Sins (1949) – Michèle Frémont dite La Michel
 Clear the Ring (1950) – Tante Pauline
 The Ferret (1950) – Elise Bonvallet
 Born of Unknown Father (1950) – Mme Denis
 Adventures of Captain Fabian (1951) – Josephine
 Two Pennies Worth of Violets (1951) – Jeanne Desforges
 Le Plaisir (1952) – Marie Rivet (segment "La Maison Tellier")
 Stranger on the Prowl (1952) – Grocery Store Clerk (victim)
 A Mother's Secret (1952)
 The Other Side of Paradise (1953) – Mme Roumégoux
 Children of Love (1953) – Mlle Lefort
 La fille perdue (1954)
 Service Entrance (1954) – Madame Delecluze
 Master of Life and Death (1955) – Louise Kerbrec
 Black Dossier (1955) – Mme. Limousin – la femme du procureur
 Lola Montès (1955) – Lieutenant James' Sister
 People of No Importance (1956) – Germaine Constantin dite Mme Germaine
 Goubbiah, mon amour (1956) – Goubbiah's Aunt
 Paris Palace Hotel (1956) – Petit rôle (uncredited)
 Les lumières du soir (1956) – Une demandeuse d'emploi
 I'll Get Back to Kandara (1956)
 The Vintage (1957) – Eugénie (uncredited)
 Bonjour jeunesse (1957) – La cousine
 An Eye for an Eye (1957) – Mme Laurier
 Les Truands (1957) – Nana Benoît aîné
 Un homme se penche sur son passé (1958) – Madame Le Floch
 Toi, le venin (1958) – Amélie
 Women Are Weak (1959) – Mother Superior
 Gangster Boss (1959) – La guide polyglotte au Louvre
 The President (1961) – Madame Taupin (uncredited)
 Famous Love Affairs (1961) – La duchesse (segment "Comédiennes, Les")
 The Burning Court (1962) – Augusta Henderson – Housekeeper
 Le glaive et la balance (1963) – Une dame du jury
 Trap for Cinderella (1965) – L'infirmière
 Paris au mois d'août (1966) – Mme Pampine, la concierge
 Peace in the Fields (1970) – Johanna
 Macédoine (1971) – La chef d'atelier
 The Tenant (1976) – Head Nurse
 Les Misérables (1982) – La logeuse de la maison Corbeau
 La femme ivoire (1984) – Mlle Berthe
 Agent trouble (1987) – Madame Sackman, la directrice du musée
 Les Maris, les Femmes, les Amants (1989) – Mère dentiste

References

External links

1898 births
1994 deaths
French film actresses
French silent film actresses
People from Caracas
20th-century French actresses